The Edmund Hillary Fellowship is a Fellowship programme in New Zealand and community that provides exceptional entrepreneurs, investors and startup teams with a platform to incubate global impact ventures. The idea behind the Fellowship was to bring foreign entrepreneurs and investors to New Zealand to incubate new businesses. The Immigration New Zealand partnered with the Edmund Hillary Fellowship to deliver Global Impact Visa to 400 international applications over four years. It was setup in 2016 and has 532 fellows (400 international and 132 kiwis) as of March 2022.

Yoseph Ayele is one of the co-founders of the Edmund Hillary Fellowship and was the first CEO as well. 

Fellows of this Fellowship include Naval Ravikant, Deepa Malik, Amitabh Kant,

References

Business